The 2014–15 Puebla season was the 68th professional season of Mexico's top-flight football league. The season is split into two tournaments—the Torneo Apertura and the Torneo Clausura—each with identical formats and each contested by the same eighteen teams. Puebla began their season on July 17, 2014 against Club Tijuana, Puebla plays their homes games on Saturdays at 17:00pm local time.

Torneo Apertura 2014
List of Mexican football transfers summer 2014
current squad Clausura 2014

 
 
For recent transfers, see List of Mexican football transfers winter 2013–14.

Regular season

Apertura 2014 results

Goalscorers

Results

Results summary

Results by round

Apertura 2014 Copa MX

Group stage

Apertura results

Quarterfinals

Apertura results

Semifinals

Apertura results

final

Apertura results

Goalscorers

Results

Results by round

Torneo Clausura 2015

Regular season

Clausura 2015 results

Goalscorers

Results summary

Results by round

Clausura 2015 Copa MX

Group stage

Apertura results

Quarterfinals

Apertura results

Semifinals

Apertura results

Final

Goalscorers

Results

Results by round

References

Puebla F.C. seasons
Puebla